Lewice may refer to the following places:
Lewice, Greater Poland Voivodeship (west-central Poland)
Lewice, Opole Voivodeship (south-west Poland)
Lewice, West Pomeranian Voivodeship (north-west Poland)